Break the News is a 1938 British musical comedy film directed by René Clair and starring Jack Buchanan, Maurice Chevalier and June Knight. Two struggling performers decide to create a fake murder scandal in order to drum up publicity for their act. It was based on the novel Le mort en fuite by Loïc Le Gouriadec which had previously been made into a 1936 French film Death on the Run. Songs featured include It All Belongs to You (Cole Porter, sung by Chevalier) and We're Old Buddies (Van Phillips, Jack Buchanan, sung by Chevalier and Buchanan).

Cast
 Maurice Chevalier - François Verrier
 Jack Buchanan - Teddy Enton
 June Knight - Grace Gatwick
 Marta Labarr - Sonia
 Gertrude Musgrove - Helena
 Garry Marsh - Producer
 Wallace Douglas - Stage manager
 Joss Ambler - Press agent
 Mark Daly - Property man
 Gibb McLaughlin - Superintendent
 Robb Wilton - cab driver
 Felix Aylmer - Sir George Bickory
 C. Denier Warren - Sir Edward Phring
 George Hayes - Tribunal President
 Guy Middleton - Englishman
 Athole Stewart - Governor
 Charles Lefeaux - Interpreter
 D.J. Williams - Judge
 Elliott Mason - Dresser
 J. Abercomie - Neighbor
 William Fazan - Passport Official
 H.R. Hignett - Prison Guard
 Wally Patch - Prison Guard
 Hal Gordon - Prison Guard
 George Benson - Firing Squad Officer
 Nigel Stock - Stage Boy

Critical reception
Allmovie wrote, "What a combination! Break the News boasted the talents of English stage star Jack Buchanan, French entertainer Maurice Chevalier, legendary director Rene Clair, and songwriter Cole Porter. But what should have made for dynamite entertainment, fizzled in the eyes of disappointed contemporary reviewers" ; as The New York Times put it, "there is little to suggest the old Clair wit and humor." However, TV Guide wrote, "the always enchanting Buchanan and Chevalier are a pleasure to watch in this funny, energetic musical that features some hilariously suspenseful sequences. Although it may not rank with director Clair's French classics, this perfect piece of British entertainment holds its own special place."

References

External links

1938 films
1938 musical comedy films
British musical comedy films
1930s English-language films
Films directed by René Clair
British black-and-white films
Films shot at Pinewood Studios
British remakes of French films
Films set in London
1930s British films